A statue of Oscar De La Hoya by Erik Blome is installed outside Los Angeles' Crypto.com Arena, in the U.S. state of California. The bronze sculpture was unveiled in 2008. De La Hoya was born in East Los Angeles and was known as "The Golden Boy of boxing".

References 

Bronze sculptures in California
Monuments and memorials in Los Angeles
Outdoor sculptures in Greater Los Angeles
Sculptures of men in California
South Park (Downtown Los Angeles)
Statues in Los Angeles
Statues of sportspeople